Tetyana Semykina (née Yatsenkyan - , later Teklyan - ; born October 19, 1973) is a Ukrainian sprint canoer who competed from the late 1990s to the mid-2000s (decade). Competing in two Summer Olympics, she won a bronze medal in the K-4 500 m event at Athens in 2004.

Semykina also won two medals in the K-4 1000 m event at the ICF Canoe Sprint World Championships with a silver in 2003 and a bronze in 2001.

References
DatabaseOlympics.com profile

Sports-reference.com profile

1973 births
Canoeists at the 1996 Summer Olympics
Canoeists at the 2004 Summer Olympics
Ukrainian female canoeists
Olympic canoeists of Ukraine
Olympic bronze medalists for Ukraine
Living people
Olympic medalists in canoeing
ICF Canoe Sprint World Championships medalists in kayak
Medalists at the 2004 Summer Olympics